The 1995 National Invitation Tournament was the 1995 edition of the annual NCAA college basketball competition.  The 1995 tournament was notable for the roster size of eventual champion Virginia Tech - injuries prior to and during the tournament meant the Hokies won some games with as few as six active players.

Selected teams
Below is a list of the 32 teams selected for the tournament.

Bracket
Below are the four first round brackets, along with the four-team championship bracket.

Semifinals & finals

See also
 1995 National Women's Invitational Tournament
 1995 NCAA Division I men's basketball tournament
 1995 NCAA Division II men's basketball tournament
 1995 NCAA Division III men's basketball tournament
 1995 NCAA Division I women's basketball tournament
 1995 NCAA Division II women's basketball tournament
 1995 NCAA Division III women's basketball tournament
 1995 NAIA Division I men's basketball tournament
 1995 NAIA Division II men's basketball tournament
 1995 NAIA Division I women's basketball tournament
 1995 NAIA Division I women's basketball tournament

References

National Invitation
National Invitation Tournament
1990s in Manhattan
Basketball competitions in New York City
College sports in New York City
Madison Square Garden
National Invitation Tournament
National Invitation Tournament
Sports in Manhattan